Chapmannia gracilis is a species of flowering plant in the family Fabaceae. It is found only in Yemen. Its natural habitat is subtropical or tropical dry forests.

References

Dalbergieae
Endemic flora of Socotra
Near threatened plants
Taxa named by Isaac Bayley Balfour
Taxonomy articles created by Polbot